Finch is an open-source console-based instant messaging client, based on the libpurple library. Libpurple has support for many commonly used instant messaging protocols, allowing the user to log in to various services from one application. Finch uses GLib and ncurses.

Finch supports OTR via a libpurple plugin.

See also 

 Multiprotocol instant messaging application
 Comparison of instant messaging protocols
 Comparison of instant messaging clients
 Comparison of Internet Relay Chat clients
 Comparison of XMPP clients
 Online chat

References

External links
 Finch Help Page
 Finch Source Code

Free instant messaging clients
Instant messaging clients for Linux
AIM (software) clients
Free XMPP clients
Free Internet Relay Chat clients
Internet Relay Chat clients
Portable software
Cross-platform software
Free software programmed in C
Yahoo! instant messaging clients
Cross-platform free software
Free communication software
Software that uses ncurses